The Battle of Surkonty took place on 21 August 1944. It is regarded as the first clash between the Polish Home Army and regular forces of the Red Army, supported by the NKVD. 

The Soviets lost 132 men KIA, while Polish losses were 35 KIA (including local commandant, Colonel Maciej “Kotwicz” Kalenkiewicz) and 1 WIA.

Battle
In late June 1944, the unit of Kotwicz left the area of Grodno, and headed eastwards, to join Home Army forces from Stolpce in order to fight together in Operation Ostra Brama. On 13 July, the Home Army of the Vilnius Region, together with the Red Army, freed the city from the German invaders. Soon afterwards, the NKVD began arresting Polish soldiers, and as a result of this action, the local headquarters of the Home Army ordered all men to withdraw to the countryside.

They were soon spotted by Soviet aircraft, so it was decided that the soldiers should be divided into smaller groups, and march towards Białystok. The unit of Maciej Kalenkowicz remained in the forest for a while, but under Soviet pressure, it had to retreat southwest.

On 21 August, the Poles were attacked by the 3rd Battalion of the 32nd Motorized Regiment of the NKVD. The battle lasted five hours: Colonel Kalenkowicz was killed, together with 32 others, twenty of whom were bayoneted to death.

The Battle of Surkonty is commemorated on the Tomb of the Unknown Soldier, Warsaw, with the inscription "SURKONTY 21 VIII 1944".

Cemetery
The graves of the Polish fighters who died in the battle are located in a cemetery near the village of Surkonty.

The cemetery was created in 1991 and its inauguration was attended by around 2,000 people, half from Poland and half from the local district.

It is alleged by Poland that, in August 2022, the graves have been destroyed by the authorities of Belarus.

References

External links
 "Cemetery web site"

Sources 
 Wyklęte życiorysy. Poznań: Dom Wydawniczy Rebis. .

Battles involving Poland
Battles involving the Soviet Union